Joe Frazier (1944–2011) was an American boxer.

Joe Frazier may also refer to:

Joe Frazier (baseball) (1922–2011), American baseball player
Joe Frazier (1937–2014), musician, member of The Chad Mitchell Trio
Joe "Speedo" Frazier (1943–2014), musician, member of The Impalas

See also
Jo Fraser (born 1986), Scottish painter
Joe Fraser (born 1998), English gymnast